Canola is a vegetable oil derived from rapeseed.

Canola may also refer to:

 Canola (film), a South Korean film
 Canola (mythology), the inventor of the harp in Celtic mythology
 Marco Canola (b. 1988), an Italian racing cyclist